Twentieth-Century Blues: The Songs of Noël Coward is a 1998 Noël Coward tribute album curated by Neil Tennant, who invited prominent artists of the day to reinterpret Noël Coward’s songs for the late 20th century.

Profits from the albums sale were donated to the Red Hot AIDS Charitable Trust.

The album yielded the double A-sided single "Someday I'll Find You" / "I've Been to a Marvellous Party", which reached number 28 in the UK Singles Chart.

A Twentieth-Century Blues DVD was also released.

Some altercations occurred during the recording of the album. Black Grape were originally meant to record "Mad Dogs and Englishmen", but the band withdrew due to a conflict between members; Space recorded the song instead. In addition, the final song recorded, Damon Albarn and Michael Nyman's version of "London Pride", was nearly rejected due to being, reportedly, almost unrecognisable in its original version. Tennant ordered the song to be kept, though Albarn had already agreed to make changes by that time.

Suede were asked to release their version of "Poor Little Rich Girl" as a single but declined in order to focus on preparing their next album, Head Music.

Track listing
 "Introduction"
 "Parisian Pierrot" – Texas
 "I've Been to a Marvellous Party" – The Divine Comedy
 "A Room With a View" – Paul McCartney
 "Sail Away" – Pet Shop Boys
 "Someday I'll Find You" – Shola Ama, Craig Armstrong
 "There Are Bad Times Just Around the Corner" – Robbie Williams
 "I'll See You Again" – Bryan Ferry
 "Mad About the Boy" – Marianne Faithfull
 "Mad Dogs and Englishmen" – Space
 "Poor Little Rich Girl" – Suede featuring Raissa Khan-Panni
 "I'll Follow My Secret Heart" – Sting
 "London Pride" – Damon Albarn with Michael Nyman
 "Don't Put Your Daughter on the Stage, Mrs. Worthington" – Vic Reeves
 "Twentieth Century Blues" – Elton John

References

Charity albums
1998 compilation albums
Noël Coward tribute albums